László Szekfű (16 November 1905 – 17 December 1977) was a Hungarian wrestler. He competed in the men's Greco-Roman bantamweight at the 1932 Summer Olympics.

References

External links
 

1905 births
1977 deaths
Hungarian male sport wrestlers
Olympic wrestlers of Hungary
Wrestlers at the 1932 Summer Olympics
Sportspeople from Somogy County
20th-century Hungarian people